Chad S. Johnson (born August 11, 1967 in Emporia, Kansas) is a Harvard-educated attorney, served as the Executive Director of National Stonewall Democrats from October 2, 2001 to January 1, 2003.  Prior to his tenure with NSD, Chad Johnson served as a principal gay and lesbian issues adviser to the Al Gore/Joe Lieberman 2000 campaign and as deputy national chair of the Gore/Lieberman 2000 business outreach program, under Democratic Party leader and public affairs executive Jeff Trammell.  Formerly, an attorney with Skadden, Arps, Slate, Meagher & Flom, Johnson is active in Democratic Party politics, as well is in law and business ventures.

References 

1967 births
Living people
Kansas Democrats
People from Emporia, Kansas
Harvard Law School alumni
Skadden, Arps, Slate, Meagher & Flom people